Platinum Collection is a career-spanning compilation album by British veteran rock band Genesis. It was released on 29 November 2004 in the UK and 13 September 2005 in the US. In both countries it was issued on the same day as The Video Show DVD.

The set consists of three CDs that serve as an overview of Genesis' career from their early years with Peter Gabriel as lead singer and Anthony Phillips, followed by Steve Hackett, on guitar, continuing through the era with drummer Phil Collins as lead singer, with Hackett departing early in this period, to their most recent recordings with Ray Wilson as lead singer. The collection is mostly sequenced in reverse chronological order except for the most recent track, the title track of the Calling All Stations album, being placed at the end of the first disc. The majority of the tracks were newly remixed by studio collaborator Nick Davis.

Featuring at least one track from every studio album (with the exception of their 1969 debut From Genesis to Revelation) from 1970's Trespass to 1997's Calling All Stations, Platinum Collection stands as the most comprehensive Genesis retrospective available.
     
From left to right, the cover features pictures used on the albums We Can't Dance (1991), Nursery Cryme (1971), A Trick of the Tail (1976), Foxtrot (1972),  Duke (1980), and Invisible Touch (1986).

A Phil Collins solo career compilation album, also titled Platinum Collection and also consisting of three CDs, had been released earlier in 2004.

Track listing

Personnel
Genesis
Tony Banks – keyboards 
Mike Rutherford – guitars, bass 
Phil Collins - drums on all discs except disc 1 track 16 and disc 3 track 9, vocals on disc 1 (except on track 16) and on disc 2, backing vocals on disc 3 (except on track 9)    
Peter Gabriel – lead vocals, flute on disc 3
Anthony Phillips – guitars on disc 3 track 9
Steve Hackett – guitars on disc 2 from track 9 and on disc 3 (except on track 9)
Ray Wilson – vocals on disc 1 track 16
John Mayhew - drums on disc 3 track 9

Additional personnel
Nir Zidkyahu – drums on disc 1 track 16
Brian Eno – Enossifications on disc 3 track 2

Charts

Certifications

References

Albums produced by Nick Davis (record producer)
Albums produced by Hugh Padgham
Albums produced by David Hentschel
Genesis (band) compilation albums
2004 compilation albums
Atlantic Records compilation albums
Virgin Records compilation albums
Albums recorded at Trident Studios
Albums recorded at Polar Studios